All the Best! 1999–2009 (stylized as ALL the BEST! 1999–2009) is the third greatest hits album by Japanese pop boy band Arashi. The album was released on August 19, 2009 in Japan under their record label J Storm in two editions, a limited 3CD version and a regular 2CD version. The album debuted at number-one on the Oricon album weekly chart, selling 753,430 copies. Thirteen days after the release of All the Best! 1999–2009 the album sold over a million copies. As of September 22, 2009, All the Best! 1999–2009 had overtaken Supermarket Fantasy to claim the title of best-selling album of the year in Japan.  On December 18, 2009, Oricon officially ranked All the Best! 1999–2009 as the best-selling album in Japan for 2009, with over 1.43 million copies sold.

Album information
Both the regular and limited editions contain all of the band's singles from their debut single "Arashi" (1999) to "Ashita no Kioku/Crazy Moon (Kimi wa Muteki)" (2009), with the exception of Satoshi Ohno's solo single. A new song titled "5x10" was included with both editions. The song's lyrics were written by Arashi themselves to express their gratitude for their fans. The regular edition exclusively contains a hidden track titled "Attack It!" while the limited edition exclusively contains a third disc of the band's selections and a premium booklet.

Critical reception

Ian Martin from AllMusic gave the album three and a half out of five stars, stating that the first disc is "the most fun", the second disc is "seeming to be taking aim at courting a more mature (read: 'bland') image" and the third disc is "a curious collection of tracks that certainly adds variety to the compilation". CDJournal gave the album a star for an exceptional work and praised the members vocal delivery.

Commercial performance
Upon the release of the album, it debuted at number-one on the Oricon daily album chart selling over 261,070 copies. On the weekly album chart the album took the number-one spot selling 753,430 copies. Due to the high opening sales, All the Best! 1999–2009 held the record for the best opening numbers for an album in the year 2009 and is their best-selling album. The album stayed at number-one for two consecutive weeks, selling over 232,800 copies in its second week. Thirteen days after release, All the Best! 1999–2009 passed one million copies sold, making it the first to do so in 2009. After five weeks, the album rose to the top of the Oricon yearly album chart, overtaking Mr. Children's Supermarket Fantasy.

In June 2010, it was reported that the album had sold a total of around 1,600,000 copies. As of August 2010, the album has sold a total of around 1,729,000 copies. As of April 2019, the album has sold a total of around 1,980,000 copies.

Track listing

Charts and certifications

Weekly charts

Year-end charts

Certifications and sales

Release history

Footnotes

References

External links
 All the Best! 1999–2009 product information 

Arashi albums
2009 greatest hits albums
Japanese-language compilation albums
J Storm compilation albums